Kawasemi is a steel roller coaster at Tobu Zoo that opened in 2008.

References